Hydroscapha jaechi, is a species of skiff beetle endemic to Sri Lanka.

Description
This tiny species has a length of fore body about 0.66 to 0.72 mm. Postero-median projection of the sternite VII is irregular, long and very narrow. Chaetotaxy with two tufts in Sternite V. Posterior margin of the Sternite V is weakly sinuate. In female, Sternite VI is trilobate in shape apically and the lateral margin of lateral lobes is convex. In male, aedeagus is angulate at dorsal face and laterally straight but not gradually narrowing apically.

References 

Myxophaga
Insects of Sri Lanka
Insects described in 1994